The Legends in Golf was a golf tournament on the European Seniors Tour from 1998 to 2003. It was played on five different courses in two countries, the Netherlands and Belgium. In 1998 it was played at Efteling Golf Park, Loon op Zand, Netherlands, in 1999 at Prise d'Eau Golf Club, Tilburg, Netherlands and in 2000 and 2001 at Crayestein Golf Club, Dordrecht, Netherlands. In 2002 it was played at Flanders Nippon Golf, Hasselt, Limburg, Belgium while in 2003 it moved to Golf de Pierpont, Les Bons Villers, Hainaut, Belgium. The next European Senior Tour event played in the Netherlands was the Van Lanschot Senior Open in 2010. In 2003 the total prize money was €130,000 with the winner receiving €19,500.

Winners

References

Former European Senior Tour events
Golf tournaments in the Netherlands
Golf tournaments in Belgium
Recurring sporting events established in 1998
Recurring sporting events disestablished in 2003